Massimo Introvigne (born June 14, 1955, in Rome) is an Italian Roman Catholic sociologist of religion and intellectual property attorney. He is a founder and the managing director of the Center for Studies on New Religions (CESNUR), a Turin-based organization which has been described as "the highest profile lobbying and information group for controversial religions".

Life and work

Introvigne was born in Rome on June 14, 1955. Introvigne earned a B.A. in Philosophy from Rome's Gregorian University in 1975, and in 1979 his Dr.Jur. from University of Turin. He worked from the law firm Jacobacci e Associati as an intellectual property attorney, specialized in domain names.

In 1972, he joined conservative Catholic group Alleanza Cattolica. From 2008 to 2016 he has served as vice-president of the group.

In 1988 he co-founded the CESNUR and has since served as the group director.

Beginning in 2012, Introvigne was listed as a "invited professor of sociology of religious movements" at the Salesian Pontifical University in Turin.

In 2012, Introvigne was appointed chairperson of the newly-formed Observatory of Religious Liberty of the Italian Ministry of Foreign Affairs.

Beginning in 2018, Introvigne was editor-in-chief of the daily magazine on religion and human rights in China, Bitter Winter, which is published by CESNUR.

Introvigne is a proponent of the theory of religious economy developed by Rodney Stark.

Introvigne and new religions
Swedish academic Per Faxneld, writing for Reading Religion, described Introvigne as "one of the major names in the study of new religions." Sociologist Roberto Cipriani has called Introvigne "one of the Italian sociologists of religion most well-known abroad, and among the world's leading scholars of new religious movements".

In 2001, sociologist Stephen A. Kent described Introvigne as a "persistent critic of any national attempts to identify or curtail so-called 'cults'", arguing that,
"In the context, therefore, of the debate over Scientology in France and Germany, CESNUR is a think-tank and lobbying group, attempting to advance Scientology's legitimation goals by influencing European and American governmental policies toward it. It is not a neutral academic association, even less so because on its web page Introvigne intermingles ideological positions within solid research and information. On issues, however, that are key to the religious human rights debates — apostates, brainwashing, undue influence, compromised academic research, 'sect' membership and the potential for harm, critical information exchange on the Internet, etc. — he advocates doctrinaire positions that favour groups like Scientology."
 
In the mid-1990s, Introvigne testified on behalf of Scientologists in a criminal trial in Lyon.

After Introvigne was critical of the publication of the 1995 report on cults by the French government, journalists described Introvigne as a "cult apologist", saying he was tied to the Catholic Alliance and Silvio Berlusconi's then ruling party. Introvigne responded that his scholarly and political activities were not connected.

Introvigne has written on the concept of brainwashing. Gandow refers to what he calls the "APA-Lie" (i.e. the way Introvigne presented the position of the American Psychological Association on brainwashing) as a scientific scandal. He published an Encyclopedia of Religion in Italy.

Journalist and Scientology-critic Tony Ortega penned a series of 2018/19 articles criticizing The Journal of CESNUR as an unreliable "apologist journal".

Popular culture and vampires
Introvigne is also director of CESPOC, the Center for the Study of Popular Culture.

He was the Italian director of the Transylvanian Society of Dracula, which included the leading academic scholars in the field of the literary and historical study of the vampire myth. In 1997, J. Gordon Melton and Introvigne organized an event at the Westin Hotel in Los Angeles where 1,500 attendees came dressed as vampires for "creative writing contest, Gothic rock music and theatrical performances".

Bibliography

Books

 Le nuove Religioni, SugarCo (1989), .
 Il cappello del mago: i nuovi movimenti magici dallo spiritismo al satanismo, SugarCo (1990), .
Il ritorno dello gnosticismo , SugarCo (1993), .
 Les Mormons, Brepols (December 30, 1996), .
The Unification Church (Studies in Contemporary Religions, 2), Signature Books (September 1, 2000) .
 Rodney Stark and Massimo Introvigne, Dio è tornato. Indagine sulla rivincita delle religioni in Occidente, Piemme (2003), .
 Laurence R. Iannaccone and Massimo Introvigne, Il Mercato dei Martiri. L'industria del terrorismo suicida, Lindau (2004), .
 Satanism: A Social History, Brill (2016), .
 The Plymouth Brethren, Oxford University Press (2018), .
 Il libro nero della persecuzione religiosa in Cina, SugarCo (2019), .
Inside The Church of Almighty God: The Most Persecuted Religious Movement in China, Oxford University Press (2020),

See also 
 New religious movement
 Theosophy and visual arts

References

External links

 

1955 births
Living people
Italian Roman Catholics
Researchers of new religious movements and cults
Writers from Turin
21st-century Italian philosophers
Italian sociologists
CESNUR
Western esotericism scholars
Jurists from Turin